Khalag is a rural locality (a selo) and the administrative centre of Khalagsky Selsoviet, Tabasaransky District, Republic of Dagestan, Russia. The population was 678 as of 2010. There are 3 streets.

Geography 
Khalag is located 18 km southwest of Khuchni (the district's administrative centre) by road. Bukhnag is the nearest rural locality.

References 

Rural localities in Tabasaransky District